Leonardo Benvenuti (8 September 1923 – 3 November 2000) also called Leo, was an Italian screenwriter. He wrote for more than 130 films between 1948 and 2000. He was born in Florence, Italy and died in Rome, Italy.

Selected filmography

 Once Upon a Time in America (1984)
 All My Friends Part 2 (1982)
 Bianco, rosso e Verdone (1981)
 Goodnight, Ladies and Gentlemen (1978)
 Professor Kranz tedesco di Germania (1978)
 My Friends (1975)
 The Flower in His Mouth (1975)
 Alfredo, Alfredo (1972)
 Lo chiameremo Andrea (1972)
 Between Miracles (1971)
 Let's Have a Riot (1970)
 Ghosts – Italian Style (1968)
 Misunderstood (1966)
 I complessi (1965)
 A Question of Honour (1965)
 Marriage Italian-Style (1964)
 Kali Yug: Goddess of Vengeance (1963)
 Shivers in Summer (1963)
 Girl with a Suitcase (1961)
 The Joy of Living (1961)
 A Man of Straw (1958)
 Guendalina (1957)
 Fathers and Sons (1957)
 Amici per la pelle (1955)
 House of Ricordi (1954)
 Symphony of Love (1954)
 Farewell, My Beautiful Lady (1954)
 Loving You Is My Sin (1953)
 What Scoundrels Men Are! (1953)
 Beauties on Motor Scooters (1952)
 Son of the Hunchback (1952)
 The Crossroads (1951)
 Mistress of the Mountains (1950)
 Captain Demonio (1950)

References

External links

1923 births
2000 deaths
20th-century Italian screenwriters
David di Donatello winners
Italian male screenwriters
20th-century Italian male writers